Syndite is a composite material which combines the hardness, abrasion resistance and thermal conductivity of diamond with the toughness of tungsten carbide.

Applications

 cutting tools for machining 
 a wide variety of abrasive materials
 wear part applications

Advantages

 improved life of the tool, or wear part 
 improved process reliability 
 improved frictional behaviour

Grades

Syndite is produced in five standard grades:

 CTB002
 CTC 002
 CTB010
 CTB025
 CTH 025 

The numbers refer to the average dimensions in micrometres of the starting diamond material. The designation CTB indicates standard Polycrystalline diamond (PCD) products, whereas CTC and CTH indicate modified PCD grades.   Syndite CTB010 may, in most cases, be regarded as the general-purpose grade.

Sources 
 Syndite

Superhard materials